The Coppa San Geo is a one-day cycling race held annually in Italy. It was part of UCI Europe Tour in category 1.2 from 2007 to 2009, when it was reserved for amateurs in 2010.

Winners

References

Cycle races in Italy
UCI Europe Tour races
Recurring sporting events established in 1925
1925 establishments in Italy
Sport in Lombardy